Sesame Street's 50th Anniversary Celebration is a 2019 musical television special to celebrate the 50th anniversary of Sesame Street. Hosted by Joseph Gordon-Levitt, the special aired on November 9, 2019, on HBO, followed by a November 17 airing on PBS. It stars the cast and Muppets of Sesame Street, including Kermit the Frog, from the past and present. Many retired cast members and characters reunited on the street for the first time in years since their last appearances. This is the final Sesame Street special to feature long-time Muppet performer Caroll Spinney, who performed Big Bird and Oscar the Grouch for 50 years as well as the cast members Emilio Delgado and Bob McGrath, who played Luis and Bob, respectively, for 45 years.

Plot

The special opens with Cookie Monster looking for directions to Sesame Street (and picking up cookies along the way). After a montage of various versions of the theme song, he arrives on Sesame Street with Joseph Gordon-Levitt who really wants to take a picture under the famous street sign but the trouble is it has gone missing. It is up to Elmo, Abby, Rosita and Grover to find it in time for the big photo while stopping Joseph from finding out. Meanwhile, Gonger is flying away on a balloon and Cookie Monster needs to get him back down for the party. Human cast members, Gordon, Susan, Bob, Gina, Luis, Maria, Linda, Leela and Miles return as Norah Jones sings "Welcome to the Party". Joseph takes a trip through Sesame Street history, bumping into some classic characters along the way, including Kermit the Frog (who sings "Bein' Green" with Elvis Costello).

Whoopi Goldberg, Patti LaBelle, Sterling K. Brown, Itzhak Perlman, Fran Brill, Caroll Spinney and Debra Spinney all arrive to celebrate while there are musical performances from Nile Rodgers, singing "The People in Your Neighborhood" with Ernie and Grover, Solange Knowles, singing "I Remember" with Elmo, Abby, Grover and Zoe, and Meghan Trainor, singing "Count Me In" with Elmo and Abby. Other highlights include a medley of Sesame Street songs, Sterling learning how to eat cookies like Cookie Monster and Whoopi and Itzhak helping Ernie "Put Down the Duckie". The special ends with a performance of "Sing" by the whole cast, led by Patti as it turns out Big Bird and Snuffy were decorating the street sign for the big party.

Cast

Host
 Joseph Gordon-Levitt

Cast
 Alison Bartlett as Gina
 Linda Bove as Linda
 Emilio Delgado as Luis
 Olamide Faison as Miles
 Bill Irwin as Mr. Noodle
 Chris Knowings as Chris
 Loretta Long as Susan
 Sonia Manzano as Maria
 Bob McGrath as Bob
 Alan Muraoka as Alan
 Roscoe Orman as Gordon
 Nitya Vidyasagar as Leela
 Suki Lopez as Nina

Special Guests Stars
 Fran Brill - Herself
 Sterling K. Brown - Himself
 Elvis Costello - Himself
 Whoopi Goldberg - Herself
 Norah Jones - Herself
 Solange Knowles - Herself
 Patti LaBelle - Herself
 Itzhak Perlman - Himself
 Nile Rodgers - Himself
 Caroll Spinney - Himself
 Debra Spinney - Herself
 Meghan Trainor - Herself

Sesame Street Muppet Performers
 Pam Arciero – Goldilocks and Grundgetta
 Jennifer Barnhart – Gladys the Cow, Mama Bear and Zoe
 Tau Bennett
 Warrick Brownlow-Pike – Gonger
 Tyler Bunch – Dish, Letter A, Louie and Horatio the Elephant (puppeteer only)
 Leslie Carrara-Rudolph – Abby Cadabby
 Frankie Cordero – Rudy
 Kevin Clash – Baby Natasha, Mel and Benny Rabbit
 Joey Mazzarino – Ingrid, Murray Monster, Merry Monster, Stinky the Stinkweed, Narf and Frazzle
 Stephanie D'Abruzzo – Pink Jacket, Lulu, Googel, Elizabeth, Little Bird and Prairie Dawn
 Ryan Dillon – Elmo, Don Music, Roosevelt Franklin (puppeteer only) and Lefty the Salesman
 Stacey Gordon – Julia
 Christopher Thomas Hayes – Hoots the Owl
 Eric Jacobson – Bert, Grover, Oscar the Grouch, Guy Smiley, Harvey Kneeslapper and Two-Headed Monster (left head)
 John Kennedy – The Amazing Mumford
 Peter Linz – Ernie, Herry Monster and Captain Vegetable
 Spencer Lott
 Noel MacNeal – Letter C
 Paul McGinnis – Letter B
 Carmen Osbahr – Rosita, Ovejita and Spoon
 Martin P. Robinson – Mr. Snuffleupagus, Slimey the Worm (puppeteer only), Old MacDonald, Monty and Telly Monster
 David Rudman – Cookie Monster, Baby Bear, Sonny Friendly, Letter Y, Ernestine, Two-Headed Monster (right head) and Humphrey
 Matt Vogel – Big Bird, Count von Count, Kermit the Frog, Forgetful Jones, Mr. Johnson and Sherlock Hemlock

Voices
 Chris Knowings – Roosevelt Franklin
 Peter Linz – Horatio the Elephant
 Caroll Spinney – Taxi Driver
 Jim Henson – The Baker (archival audio)

Songs
 "Can You Tell Me How to Get to Sesame Street?" (over a montage of various intros through the years)
 "Welcome (to the Party)" – Norah Jones, Big Bird, and the human cast
 "The People in Your Neighborhood" – Nile Rodgers, Grover, and Ernie
 "Bein' Green" – Elvis Costello and Kermit the Frog
 Medley: "I Love Trash", "ABC-DEF-GHI", "Elmo's Song", "One of These Things", "Rubber Duckie", "C Is For Cookie" – Joseph Gordon-Levitt, Susan, Bob, Oscar, Big Bird, Elmo, Ernie and Cookie Monster
 "I Remember" – Solange Knowles (featuring Elmo, Abby Cadabby, Grover, and Zoe)
 "Count Me In" – Meghan Trainor (featuring Elmo and Abby Cadabby)
 "Put Down the Duckie" – Hoots the Owl and Ernie with guest stars
 "Sing" – The cast and special guests
 "This is My Street" – Thomas Rhett and the cast (used during the end credits)

Critical reception
Sesame Street's 50th Anniversary Celebration has received generally positive reviews from television critics and parents of young children. Nardine Saad of Los Angeles Times wrote, "A party-themed event hosted by Sesame Street fanboy Joseph Gordon-Levitt. It features the beloved colorful muppets and plenty of former cast members for the Count to count and cookies for Cookie Monster to devour. Several celebrities were also — briefly — on hand to talk shop or sing a song. Or seven." Sandra Gonzalez of CNN wrote, "Honors the moments that taught generations of children the building blocks of learning through song, stories and silliness." Mark Kennedy of Associated Press wrote, "Fifty years ago, beloved entertainer Carol Burnett appeared on the very first broadcast of a quirky TV program that featured a bunch of furry puppets." Lauren Messman of The New York Times wrote, "Now Sesame Street will take a trip down memory lane with a special anniversary celebration, hosted by Joseph Gordon-Levitt. The show will recreate iconic musical numbers, like "People in Your Neighborhood" and "It's Not Easy Being Green" with Kermit the Frog. Over the years, musicians like Johnny Cash and Destiny's Child have stopped by to sing on Sesame Street, and the anniversary will be no different, welcoming stars like Meghan Trainor, Patti LaBelle, Elvis Costello and Nile Rodgers to join the beloved characters for special segments and songs."

References

External links
 Sesame Workshop website
 

Sesame Street features
Anniversary television episodes
HBO network specials
PBS original programming
Musical television specials